Vahideh Isari (born 19 September 1986) is an Iranian footballer who plays as a defender for Kowsar Women Football League club Zobahan Isfahan. She has been a member of the senior Iran women's national team.

References 

1986 births
Living people
Iranian women's footballers
Iran women's international footballers
Women's association football defenders
People from Golestan Province
21st-century Iranian women